Himself is the 18th comedy album by Bill Cosby. it contains highlights from the stand-up comedy film of the same name. This is his only album released on Motown Records.

Reception 
Bill Cassel of All Music Guide argued that the audio only version removed all distractions brought "his total mastery of his art [...] into sharper focus" and that it was "a professional comedian at the top of his game, toying with structure, timing, and tone, holding his audience with absolute confidence." Cassel did note that "times have changed" and also that with hindsight the tragic death of Cosby's son Ennis changes the tone of some moments.

Track listing
 "The Dentist" - 5:59
 "Natural Childbirth" - 8:16
 "Brain Damage" - 4:20
 "Kill the Boy" - 4:07
 "Chocolate Cake for Breakfast" - 7:44
 "Same Thing Happens Every Night" - 7:56
 "The Grandparents" - 7:06

Awards
The album was nominated for a Grammy in the category Best Comedy album.

References

External links
 [ Himself] at Allmusic

1982 albums
Bill Cosby live albums
Stand-up comedy albums
Spoken word albums by American artists
Live spoken word albums
Motown live albums
Albums produced by Steve Barri
1980s comedy albums